Joseph or Joe James may refer to:

 Joseph Caulfield James (1860–1925), English teacher and principal tutor to Prince Vajiravudh of Siam
 Joe Nathan James Jr. (1972–2022), American man executed in Alabama
 Joseph Stephen James (1849–1931), lawyer, community leader, shape note singer and composer
 Joseph James and Joseph James Jr., Kansa-Osage-French interpreters on the Kansas and Indian Territory frontier
 Joe James (racing driver) (1925–1952), American racecar driver
 Joe James (American football) (1934–2015), head football coach for the Howard Payne University Yellow Jackets
 Joe James (soccer) (born 1961), retired U.S. soccer defender
 Joe James (footballer) (1910–1993), English football centre half for Brentford
 Joe James, British vocalist of the rock band Blitz Kids
 Joe James, American jazz pianist, member of the Kid Thomas Band and the Preservation Hall Jazz Band
 Jo James, British vocalist who has performed with electronic dance music duo Flip & Fill
 Bob Armstrong (Joseph Melton James, 1939–2020), American professional wrestler
 Scott Armstrong (wrestler) (Joseph Scott James, born 1959), American professional wrestler and son of Bob Armstrong

See also

James Joseph (disambiguation)